Visham is a 1981 Indian Malayalam film, directed by P. T. Rajan and produced by Thomas Mathew. The film stars Srividya, Ratheesh, Menaka and MG Soman in the lead roles. The film has musical score by Raghu Kumar.

Cast

Srividya as Sharada
Ratheesh as Babu
Menaka as Shoba
M. G. Soman as SI Madhu
K. P. Ummer as Gopinathan
Kundara Johnny as Johnny
Paravoor Bharathan as Kurup
C. I. Paul as K. R. K. Menon
Jagathy Sreekumar as Rajan
Jaffer Khan as Rocky (Dubbed by Thodupuzha Radhakrishnan)
Punnapra Appachan
 Indrapani
 Mannar Radha
 Sukumar Pilla
 Balan Njarakkal
 Shahul Kottaym
 Jose Kottaram
 Shaji
 Raju Puthanagadi
 George
Beena Sabu as Rathi
Manavalan Joseph as Raman Nair

Soundtrack
The music was composed by Raghu Kumar and the lyrics were written by Poovachal Khader and Alappuzha Rajasekharan Nair.

References

External links
 

1981 films
1980s Malayalam-language films
Films scored by Raghu Kumar